Hristo Telkiyski (born 7 July 1979) is a former Bulgarian football player who played as a midfielder.

Career
Born in Plovdiv, Telkiyski started his professional career at Lokomotiv Plovdiv and earned 61 appearances, before transferred to Greece. He made his A PFG debut on November 9, 1997, in a 0–5 home loss against Levski Sofia.

After the 2001–2002 season, Telkiyski was signed by Greek side PAS Giannina. Following the relegation of PAS Giannina to the Beta Ethniki in summer 2003, Telkiyski joined Akratitos. In 2003–04, Telkiyski appeared 21 times for the club of Peristeri and scored for first time in the Alpha Ethniki. On 30 November 2003 he scored goal in a 1–2 away loss against Iraklis Thessaloniki.

Telkiyski would spend the next 1.5 seasons with Alpha Ethniki side Kallithea F.C. before joining second division Panachaiki in January 2006. He joined Proodeftiki F.C. in the following season and then moved to Cyprus to play for second division AEP Paphos F.C. for one season. He returned to Greece to play in the third division with Fostiras F.C., Trikala F.C. and Iraklis Psachna F.C.

On 4 January 2012, Telkiyski joined Botev Plovdiv.

References

External links
Statistics at Onsports.gr

Living people
1979 births
Bulgarian footballers
Association football midfielders
PFC Lokomotiv Plovdiv players
PAS Giannina F.C. players
A.P.O. Akratitos Ano Liosia players
Kallithea F.C. players
Panachaiki F.C. players
Proodeftiki F.C. players
Trikala F.C. players
AEP Paphos FC players
Botev Plovdiv players
First Professional Football League (Bulgaria) players
Cypriot Second Division players
Super League Greece players
Expatriate footballers in Greece
Expatriate footballers in Cyprus
Bulgarian expatriates in Greece